Sindre Buraas (born 8 May 1989) is a retired Norwegian long-distance runner competing primarily in the 5000 metres. He represented his country at the 2013 and 2015 World Championships in Athletics reaching the final on the first occasion. In addition, he won the gold medal at the 2011 European U23 Championships.

International competitions

Personal bests
Outdoor
1500 metres – 3:42.20 (Oslo 2011)
3000 metres – 7:50.72 (Rieti 2015)
3000 metres steeplechase – 9:13.26 (Florø 2008)
5000 metres – 13:11.96 (Heusden-Zolder 2015)
10,000 metres – 28:56.46 (Oslo 2010)
Half marathon – 1:05:49 hours (Oslo 2013)

References

External links
 

1989 births
Living people
People from Hurdal
Norwegian male long-distance runners
World Athletics Championships athletes for Norway
Sportspeople from Viken (county)